The 1972 Indiana Hoosiers football team represented the Indiana Hoosiers in the 1972 Big Ten Conference football season. The Hoosiers played their home games at Memorial Stadium in Bloomington, Indiana. The team was coached by John Pont, in his eighth and final year as head coach of the Hoosiers, before being fired at the end of the season.

Schedule

1973 NFL draftees

References

Indiana
Indiana Hoosiers football seasons
Indiana Hoosiers football